Skyy is a brand of vodka.

Skyy may also refer to:

 Alexis Skyy (born 1994), American television personality
 Skyy Moore (born 2000), American football player
 Skyy (band), a former American band
 Skyy (album), the band's 1979 debut album
 Skyy Radio 106.6FM, a commercial radio station in Sierra Leone

See also
Sky (disambiguation)
Skye (disambiguation)